

Werner Schulze (15 January 1895 – 3 November 1966) was a German general in the Wehrmacht during World War II who commanded several divisions. He was a recipient of the Knight's Cross of the Iron Cross with Oak Leaves of Nazi Germany.

Awards and decorations

 Clasp to the Iron Cross (1939)  2nd Class (27 July 1941) & 1st Class (4 August 1941)
 Honour Roll Clasp of the Army (28 November 1941)
 German Cross in Gold on 2 October 1943 as Oberst of the Reserves in Grenadier-Regiment 551
 Knight's Cross of the Iron Cross with Oak Leaves
 Knight's Cross on 1 March 1942 as Major of the Reserves and commander of II./Infanterie-Regiment 510
 557th Oak Leaves on 23 August 1944 as Oberst of the Reserves and commander of Grenadier-Regiment 551

References

Citations

Bibliography

 
 
 

1895 births
1966 deaths
Major generals of the German Army (Wehrmacht)
German Army personnel of World War I
Recipients of the clasp to the Iron Cross, 1st class
Recipients of the Gold German Cross
Recipients of the Knight's Cross of the Iron Cross with Oak Leaves
German prisoners of war in World War II held by the United Kingdom
People from Calbe
People from the Province of Saxony
German Army generals of World War II
Military personnel from Saxony-Anhalt